The Clocktower is an American restaurant located at the Metropolitan Life Insurance Company Tower in the Flatiron District of Manhattan, New York City. Despite its name it is on the second floor of the building, not in the structure's clock tower. The Clocktower received a Michelin star in the 2018 Michelin Guide for New York City. The restaurant lost the star in 2022.  

To enter the restaurant, diners walk through the lobby of the Edition Hotel, also located in the building. The Clocktower is a collaboration between Philadelphia-based restaurateur Stephen Starr and London-based chef Jason Atherton. It is Atherton's first restaurant project in the United States.

Design
The restaurant has a dining area, a separate bar, and a room with a billiards table. The dining area is split into three separate rooms. The restaurant is decorated throughout with black and white photographs, mostly taken in New York City. Guests are provided a booklet with information about the pictures upon request.

Tableware
Much of the tableware used at the Clocktower was sourced by Starr employee Randi Sirkin from the website Etsy. Atherton was also involved in the selection process. The tableware includes porcelain plates decorated with skulls wearing crowns and other regal paraphernalia, which Atherton now uses in some of his restaurants in London and Singapore.

References

Restaurants established in 2015
Restaurants in Manhattan
Flatiron District
Michelin Guide starred restaurants in New York (state)
2015 establishments in New York City